The 2019 Unibet Premier League Darts was a darts tournament organised by the Professional Darts Corporation – the fifteenth edition of the tournament. The event began on Thursday 7 February at the Utilita Arena in Newcastle and ended with the Play-offs at The O2 Arena in London on Thursday 23 May. It was also the last to feature Raymond van Barneveld, as he retired from professional darts after the following World Darts Championship. He appeared a record 14 times in the Premier League Darts.

Michael van Gerwen was the three-time defending champion after defeating Michael Smith 11–4 in the 2018 final. He won a fourth consecutive (and fifth overall) title by defeating Rob Cross 11–5 in the final.

Format
The tournament format was modified for this season.

Phase 1:
During the first nine nights, eight of the nine players play each other in four matches and the ninth player plays one match against one of the nine contenders. At the end of Phase 1, the bottom player is eliminated from the competition.

Phase 2:
In the seven nights of weeks 9 to 15, each player plays the other seven players once. In a change from previous years, all players only play one match each night. Phase 2 matches have been increased to a maximum of fourteen legs, allowing for a 7-7 draw. In previous years, the maximum number of legs was twelve. At the end of Phase 2, the bottom four players in the league table are eliminated from the competition.

Play-off Night:
The top four players in the league table contest the two knockout semi-finals with 1st playing 4th and 2nd playing 3rd. The semi-finals are first to 10 legs (best of 19). The two winning semi-finalists meet in the final which is first to 11 legs (best of 21).

Venues

Players
The players in this year's tournament were announced following the 2019 PDC World Darts Championship final on 1 January, with the top four of the PDC Order of Merit joined by six Wildcards.

Gary Anderson, who qualified as fourth on the Order of Merit, withdrew on 4 February, three days prior to the tournament beginning, with a back injury.

Nine invited players were chosen to appear on each of the nine Phase 1 nights in the slots which were available as a result of the withdrawal of Gary Anderson due to extended treatment for a back injury. The nine main players could earn league points if they won or drew against the invited players. The invited players would not earn any points in the competition.

Prize money
The prize money for the 2019 tournament was set to increase to £855,000 from £825,000 in 2018. As the contenders picked up four draws between them it ended up being a total of £851,500.

League stage
Players in italics are "Contenders", and will only play on that night.

7 February – Week 1 (Phase 1)
 Utilita Arena, Newcastle

14 February – Week 2 (Phase 1)
 SSE Hydro, Glasgow

21 February – Week 3 (Phase 1)
 3Arena, Dublin

28 February – Week 4 (Phase 1)
 Westpoint Arena, Exeter

7 March – Week 5 (Phase 1)
 BHGE Arena, Aberdeen

14 March – Week 6 (Phase 1)
 Motorpoint Arena Nottingham, Nottingham

21 March – Week 7 (Phase 1)
 Mercedes-Benz Arena, Berlin

27 March – Week 8A (Phase 1)
 Rotterdam Ahoy, Rotterdam

28 March – Week 8B (Phase 1)
 Rotterdam Ahoy, Rotterdam

4 April – Week 9 (Phase 2)
 SSE Arena Belfast, Belfast

11 April – Week 10 (Phase 2)
 M&S Bank Arena, Liverpool

18 April – Week 11 (Phase 2)
 Motorpoint Arena Cardiff, Cardiff

25 April – Week 12 (Phase 2)
 Arena Birmingham, Birmingham

2 May – Week 13 (Phase 2)
 Manchester Arena, Manchester

9 May – Week 14 (Phase 2)
 FlyDSA Arena, Sheffield

16 May – Week 15 (Phase 2)
 First Direct Arena, Leeds

Play-offs – 23 May
 The O2 Arena, London

Table and streaks

Table
After the withdrawal of Gary Anderson, nine invited players were added to replace him with one playing each week. After the first nine rounds in phase 1, the bottom player in the table is eliminated. In phase 2, the eight remaining players play in a single match on each of the seven nights. The top four players then compete in the knockout semi-finals and final on the playoff night.

The nine invited players are not ranked in the table, but the main nine players can earn league points for a win or draw in the games against them.

Two points are awarded for a win and one point for a draw. When players are tied on points, leg difference is used first as a tie-breaker, after that legs won against throw and then tournament average.

(Q) = Qualified For The Playoffs
(E) = Eliminated From Playoff Contention

Streaks

Positions by Week

References

External links
 PDC Professional Darts Corporation, official website
 PDC Professional Darts Corporation, official website, Tournaments

2019
2019 in darts
2019 in British sport
2019 in Irish sport
2019 in Dutch sport
2019 in German sport
February 2019 sports events in the United Kingdom
March 2019 sports events in the United Kingdom
March 2019 sports events in Europe
April 2019 sports events in the United Kingdom
May 2019 sports events in the United Kingdom